Pine Mountain is a ridge in the Appalachian Mountains running through Kentucky, Virginia and Tennessee. It extends about 125 miles from near Pioneer, Tennessee, to a location near Elkhorn City, Kentucky. It has long been a barrier to transportation, as the Cumberland River at Pineville, Kentucky is one of only two waterways that pass through the entire ridge. The other is the Clear Fork (Cumberland River tributary) near Jellico, Tennessee.

Natural areas located on the mountain includes Pine Mountain State Resort Park and Kingdom Come State Park, Breaks Interstate Park, Kiwanis Raven Rock Park, Kentenia State Forest, Pine Mountain State Scenic Trail, the Little Shepherd Trail, Blanton Forest State Nature Preserve, Bad Branch State Nature Preserve, and several others owned and managed by the Office of Kentucky Nature Preserves.

Wildlife is abundant on Pine Mountain. The land is claimed to be the "Black Bear Capital of Kentucky." Black bears, elk, rattlesnakes, and deer are found on Pine Mountain.

See also
Pine Mountain Settlement School
William Creech, Sr.
Pound Gap

References

 

Ridges of Kentucky
Ridges of Tennessee
Ridges of Virginia
Landforms of Bell County, Kentucky
Landforms of Harlan County, Kentucky
Landforms of Letcher County, Kentucky
Landforms of Whitley County, Kentucky
Landforms of Claiborne County, Tennessee
Landforms of Campbell County, Tennessee